Arsinoe was the name bestowed upon three different cities in ancient Egypt:

Arsinoe, modern Faiyum, Middle Egypt
Arsinoe (Gulf of Suez), also called Cleopatris, at the head of the Gulf of Suez
Arsinoe, also called Olbia, at the mouth of the Gulf of Suez